Laverne Eve (born 16 June 1965, in Nassau) is a female track and field athlete from the Bahamas, who competes in the javelin throw. Her personal best throw (new javelin) is 63.73 metres, achieved in April 2000 in Nashville. In her early career she also competed in shot put and discus throw. 30 years after starting her career, she still throws at a high level.

Eve was a member of the Louisiana State University track and field team.

In 1982 and in 1983, she  was awarded the Austin Sealy Trophy for the
most outstanding athlete both of the 1982 CARIFTA Games and 1983 CARIFTA Games.  She was the first athlete to gain the trophy for the second time.

International competitions

References

External links

1965 births
Living people
Sportspeople from Nassau, Bahamas
Bahamian javelin throwers
Female javelin throwers
Bahamian female athletes
Bahamian masters athletes
Olympic athletes of the Bahamas
Athletes (track and field) at the 1988 Summer Olympics
Athletes (track and field) at the 1996 Summer Olympics
Athletes (track and field) at the 2000 Summer Olympics
Athletes (track and field) at the 2004 Summer Olympics
Athletes (track and field) at the 2008 Summer Olympics
Pan American Games medalists in athletics (track and field)
Pan American Games silver medalists for the Bahamas
Pan American Games bronze medalists for the Bahamas
Athletes (track and field) at the 1987 Pan American Games
Athletes (track and field) at the 1991 Pan American Games
Athletes (track and field) at the 1995 Pan American Games
Athletes (track and field) at the 1999 Pan American Games
Athletes (track and field) at the 2003 Pan American Games
Athletes (track and field) at the 2007 Pan American Games
Athletes (track and field) at the 2011 Pan American Games
Commonwealth Games gold medallists for the Bahamas
Commonwealth Games silver medallists for the Bahamas
Commonwealth Games medallists in athletics
Athletes (track and field) at the 1994 Commonwealth Games
Athletes (track and field) at the 2002 Commonwealth Games
Athletes (track and field) at the 2006 Commonwealth Games
Athletes (track and field) at the 2010 Commonwealth Games
LSU Lady Tigers track and field athletes
Central American and Caribbean Games bronze medalists for the Bahamas
Competitors at the 1993 Central American and Caribbean Games
Competitors at the 1998 Central American and Caribbean Games
Competitors at the 2006 Central American and Caribbean Games
Competitors at the 2010 Central American and Caribbean Games
Central American and Caribbean Games medalists in athletics
Competitors at the 1990 Goodwill Games
Medalists at the 1995 Pan American Games
Medalists at the 1999 Pan American Games
Medalists at the 2003 Pan American Games
Medalists at the 2007 Pan American Games
Medallists at the 2002 Commonwealth Games
Medallists at the 2006 Commonwealth Games